Lin Fa Tei is a village in Pat Heung, Yuen Long District, Hong Kong.

Hop Shan Wai is a walled village that forms the core of Lin Fa Tei Village.

Administration
Lin Fa Tei is a recognized village under the New Territories Small House Policy.

See also
 Walled villages of Hong Kong

References

External links

 Delineation of area of existing village Lin Fa Tei (Pat Heung) for election of resident representative (2019 to 2022)

 Antiquities Advisory Board. Historic Building Appraisal. Nos. 109-112 Lin Fa Tei Pictures
 Antiquities Advisory Board. Historic Building Appraisal. Tung Yik School, No. 199 Lin Fa Tei Pictures
 Antiquities Advisory Board. Historic Building Appraisal. Fung Ancestral Hall (King Yau Tong), No. 22 Lin Fa Tei Pictures
 Antiquities Advisory Board. Historic Building Appraisal. Kwok Ancestral Hall, Lin Fa Tei Pictures

Walled villages of Hong Kong
Pat Heung
Villages in Yuen Long District, Hong Kong